The Narvesen Prize was a Norwegian prize for those who excelled in journalism. It was established in 1954 by the company Narvesen, but the Norwegian Press Association was behind the selection of winners. It was discontinued in 1990.

List of winners
1954 : Anders Buraas, Arbeiderbladet 
1955 : Gösta Hammarlund, Dagbladet 
1956 : Asbjørn Barlaup, Verdens Gang
1957 : Jorunn Johnsen, Aftenposten 
1958 : Henry Imsland, Stavanger Aftenblad 
1959 : Terje Baalsrud, Norges Handels- og Sjøfartstidende 
1960 : P. Chr. Andersen and Henning Sinding-Larsen, Aftenposten 
1961 : Jacob R. Kuhnle, Morgenavisen 
1962 : Gidske Anderson, Arbeiderbladet and Odd Hagen, Oppland Arbeiderblad 
1963 : Arne Hestenes, Dagbladet 
1964 : Einar Eriksen, Bergens Tidende 
1965 : Erik Bye, Norwegian Broadcasting Corporation
1966 : Arne H. Halvorsen, Stavanger Aftenblad 
1967 : Richard Herrmann, Norwegian Broadcasting Corporation
1968 : Arve Solstad, Dagbladet and Per Egil Hegge, Aftenposten 
1969 : Kai Otto Hansen, Bergens Arbeiderblad 
1970 : Sverre Mitsem, Tønsbergs Blad 
1971 : Asbjørn Larsen, Norwegian Broadcasting Corporation and Lars Sigurd Sunnanå, Aftenposten 
1972 : Fædrelandsvennen 
1973 : Ellen Auensen, Morgenbladet and Gunnar Filseth, Aftenposten 
1974 : Gerd Benneche, Dagbladet
1975 : Rolf W. Thanem and Geir Tønset, Adresseavisen 
1976 : Berit Eriksen
1977 : Terje Gammelsrud
1978 : Hans Melien, Adresseavisen
1979 : Rolf M. Aagaard, Aftenposten 
1980 : Arne Skouen, Dagbladet 
1981 : Erling Borgen, Norwegian Broadcasting Corporation and John Olav Egeland, Dagbladet 
1982 : Vårt Land
1983 : Kjell Gjerseth 
1984 : Knut Fjeld, Østlendingen
1985 : Kjell Øvre-Helland, Bergens Tidende 
1986 : Veslemøy Kjendsli, NRK P2 
1987 : Per A. Christiansen, Aftenposten
1988 : Dagmar Loe, Norwegian Broadcasting Corporation
1989 : Tor-Erik Røberg-Larsen and Per Ellingsen, Arbeiderbladet 
1990 : Hans-Wilhelm Steinfeld, Norwegian Broadcasting Corporation

References

Journalism awards
Norwegian awards

Awards disestablished in 1990
Awards established in 1954